The 2000 United States presidential election in Michigan took place on November 7, 2000, and was part of the 2000 United States presidential election. Voters chose 18 representatives, or electors to the Electoral College, who voted for president and vice president.

Michigan was won by Vice President Al Gore by a sizable margin of 5.1%. The western part of the state, which is more rural, was overwhelmingly Republican and Bush won most of the congressional districts and counties in that region of the state. His best performance was in Ottawa County, where he won with over 70%. Gore did fairly well in the eastern region of the state. His best performance was in Wayne County, the highest populated county in the state and home of the city of Detroit. He won the county with 69%, with his second best performance in Genesee County, where he got over 62% of the vote.

This election marked the first time since 1976 in which Michigan's electoral votes did not go to the overall winner of the general election, although the state was carried by the candidate who ultimately won the popular vote.

Bush became the first ever Republican to win the White House without carrying Kalamazoo or Muskegon Counties, as well as the first to do so without carrying Alpena or Oakland Counties since Benjamin Harrison in 1888, the first to do so without carrying Ingham County since William McKinley in 1896, and was the first Republican since Richard Nixon in 1968 to win the White House without carrying Michigan. It was also the only other state in the Midwest besides Illinois where Gore won by a majority of votes.

Michigan was 1 of 10 states that backed George H. W. Bush in the election of 1988 that never backed George W. Bush in either 2000 or 2004.

Results

By congressional district
Gore won 9 of 16 congressional districts. Both candidates won two districts won by the opposite party.

By county

Counties that flipped from Democratic to Republican
Alcona (Largest city: Harrisville)
Alger (Largest city: Munising)
Baraga (Largest city: Baraga)
Benzie (Largest city: Frankfort)
Branch (Largest city: Coldwater)
Cass (Largest city: Dowagiac)
Cheboygan (Largest city: Cheboygan)
Chippewa (Largest city: Sault Ste. Marie)
Crawford (Largest city: Grayling)
Delta (Largest city: Escanaba)
Dickinson (Largest city: Iron Mountain)
Gladwin (Largest city: Gladwin)
Gratiot (Largest city: Alma)
Houghton (Largest city: Houghton)
Huron (Largest city: Bad Axe)
Kalkaska (Largest city: Kalkaska)
Keweenaw (Largest city: Ahmeek)
Lapeer (Largest city: Lapeer)
Lenawee (Largest city: Adrian)
Luce (Largest city: Newberry)
Mackinac (Largest city: St. Ignace)
Mason (Largest city: Ludington)
Mecosta (Largest city: Big Rapids)
Menominee (Largest city: Menominee)
Montcalm (Largest city: Greenville)
Montmorency (Largest city: Lewiston)
Oceana (Largest city: Hart)
Ontonagon (Largest city: Ontonagon)
Osceola (Largest city: Reed City)
Oscoda (Largest city: Mio)
Presque Isle (Largest city: Rogers City)
Schoolcraft (Largest city: Manistique)
Shiawassee (Largest city: Owosso)
St. Clair (Largest city: Port Huron)
Tuscola (Largest city: Caro)
Van Buren (Largest city: South Haven)
Wexford (Largest city: Cadillac)

Electors

Technically the voters of Michigan cast their ballots for electors: representatives to the Electoral College. For this election, Michigan was allocated 18 electors because it had 16 congressional districts and 2 senators. All candidates who appear on the ballot or qualify to receive write-in votes must submit a list of 18 electors, who pledge to vote for their candidate and his or her running mate. Whoever wins the majority of votes in the state is awarded all 18 electoral votes. Their chosen electors then vote for president and vice president. Although electors are pledged to their candidate and running mate, they are not obligated to vote for them. An elector who votes for someone other than his or her candidate is known as a faithless elector.

The electors of each state and the District of Columbia met on December 18, 2000 to cast their votes for president and vice president. The Electoral College itself never meets as one body. Instead the electors from each state and the District of Columbia met in their respective capitols.

The following were the members of the Electoral College from the state. All were pledged to and voted for Gore and Lieberman:
Lana Boldi
John Cherry
Patty Fedewa
Sigrid L. Grace
Dona Jean Graham
Freman Hendrix
Jeff Jenks
John Kelly
Don Oetman
Ken Oke
Charles Prather
Jim Ramey
Iris K. Salters
Judith L. Strong
David P. Taylor
Juli Trudell
Mary Warner
Marie Weigold

See also
 Presidency of George W. Bush
 United States presidential elections in Michigan

References

2000
Michigan
2000 Michigan elections